State Road 157 (SR 157) is a north–south unsigned state highway in Tallahassee, Florida. It follows Woodward Avenue just south of the Florida State University campus, between Gaines Street (SR 371) and Jefferson Street.

Route description

SR 157 is a short two-lane road and maintains a  speed limit. North of its terminus at Jefferson Street, Woodward Avenue continues north for two more blocks before becoming a pedestrian pathway through the FSU campus. North of campus, Woodward Avenue resumes its course without a state designation.

Major intersections

References

157
157
Transportation in Tallahassee, Florida